Meridarchis eremitis is a moth in the family Carposinidae. It was described by Edward Meyrick in 1905. It is found in Sri Lanka.

This species has a wingspan of 17–24 mm.

References

Carposinidae
Moths described in 1905